In mathematics, a homothety (or homothecy, or homogeneous dilation) is a transformation of an affine space determined by a point S called its center and a nonzero number k called its ratio, which sends point  to a point  by the rule 
  for a fixed number .
Using position vectors:
.
,
which is a uniform scaling and shows the meaning of special choices  for :
for  one gets the identity mapping,
for  one gets the reflection at the center,

In Euclidean geometry homotheties are the similarities that fix a point and either preserve (if ) or reverse (if ) the direction of all vectors. Together with the translations, all homotheties of an affine (or Euclidean) space form a group, the group of dilations or homothety-translations. These are precisely the affine transformations with the property that the image of every line g is a line parallel to g.

In projective geometry, a homothetic transformation is a similarity transformation (i.e., fixes a given elliptic involution) that leaves the line at infinity pointwise invariant.

Here  is the ratio of magnification or dilation factor or scale factor or similitude ratio. Such a transformation can be called an enlargement if the scale factor exceeds 1. The above-mentioned fixed point S is called homothetic center or center of similarity or center of similitude.

The term, coined by French mathematician Michel Chasles, is derived from two Greek elements: the prefix homo-, meaning "similar", and thesis, meaning "position". It describes the relationship between two figures of the same shape and orientation. For example, two Russian dolls looking in the same direction can be considered homothetic.

Homotheties are used to scale the contents of computer screens; for example, smartphones, notebooks, and laptops.

Properties 
The following properties hold in any dimension.

Mapping lines, line segments and angles 
A homothety has the following properties:
 A line is mapped onto a parallel line. Hence: angles remain unchanged.
 The ratio of two line segments is preserved.
Both properties show: 
 A homothety is a similarity.

Derivation of the properties:
In order to make calculations easy it is assumed that the center   is the origin: .

Hence, the ratio (quotient) of two line segments remains unchanged .

In case of  the calculation is analogous but a little extensive.

Consequences: A triangle is mapped on a similar one. The homothetic image of a circle is a circle. The image of an ellipse is a similar one. i.e. the ratio of the two axes is unchanged.

Graphical constructions

using the intercept theorem 
The image of a point collinear with  can be determined using .

using a pantograph 
Before computers became ubiquitous, scalings of drawings were done by using a pantograph, a tool similar to a compass.

Construction and geometrical background:

Choose the ratio .
This is the case if  (Instead of  the location of the center  can be prescribed.
Attach the mobile rods rotatable at point .
Vary the location of point  and mark at each time point .

That shows: the mapping   is a homothety with center  and ratio .

Composition 

The composition of two homotheties with the same center  is again a homothety with center . The homotheties with center  form a group.
The composition of two homotheties with different centers  and its ratios  is 
in case of  a homothety with its center on line  and ratio  or 
in case of  a translation in direction . Especially, if  (point reflections).

Derivation:

For the composition  of the two homotheties  with centers  with

 
one gets by calculation for the image of point :

.
Hence, the composition is 
in case of  a translation in direction  by vector .
in case of  point 
 
is a fixpoint (is not moved) and  the composition
. 
is a homothety with center  and ratio .  lies on line .

The composition of a homothety and a translation is a homothety.

Derivation:

The composition of the homothety 
 and the translation
 is

which is a homothety with center  and ratio .

In homogenous coordinates 
The homothety  
with center  can be written as the composition of a homothety with center  and a translation:
.
Hence  can be represented  in homogeneous coordinates 
by the matrix:
.

See also
Scaling (geometry) a similar notion in vector spaces
Homothetic center, the center of a homothetic transformation taking one of a pair of shapes into the other
The Hadwiger conjecture on the number of strictly smaller homothetic copies of a convex body that may be needed to cover it
Homothetic function (economics), a function of the form f(U(y)) in which U is a homogeneous function and f is a monotonically increasing function.

Notes

References
 H.S.M. Coxeter, "Introduction to geometry" , Wiley (1961), p. 94

External links
 Homothety, interactive applet from Cut-the-Knot.

Transformation (function)